Jamie Aleshia Scott (born March 7, 1982) is an American politician who is the member of the Arkansas House of Representatives from the 37th district in Pulaski County.

Political career

Election
Scott was elected unopposed in the general election on November 6, 2018.

References

Scott, Jamie
Living people
21st-century American politicians
21st-century American women politicians
Women state legislators in Arkansas
1982 births